JS Hiuchi is a Hiuchi class Auxiliary Multi-purpose Support (AMS) ship of the Japan Maritime Self-Defense Force (JMSDF).<ref>Werth, Eric. (2007). {{Google books|TJunjRvplU4C|Naval Institute Guide to Combat Fleets of the World p. 392.|page=392}}</ref>

The ship was built by Mitsui in Tamano and commissioned into service on 27 March 2002. The primary mission of the Hiuchi is to support training exercises of other ships, including shooting practice and torpedo launching practice.

Service
This ship was one of several in the JMSDF fleet participating in disaster relief after the 2011 Tohoku earthquake and tsunami.  Hiuchi was the first of two JMSDF ships which towed barges of fresh water from Yokosuka to the Fukushima I nuclear accidents. The water was used to replace the seawater being used in cooling efforts at the plant.

Notes

References
 Werth, Eric. (2007). Naval Institute Guide to Combat Fleets of the World: Their Ships, Aircraft, and Systems.''  Annapolis: Naval Institute Press. ;

External links
 JMSDF,  AMS-4301 ひうち Hiuchi
 Ministry of Defense,  Press Conference by the Defense Minister (11:11-11:26 A.M. March 25, 2011) 

Hiuchi-class support ships
2001 ships
Ships built by Mitsui Engineering and Shipbuilding